Pirni Pro is a discontinued network security tool designed for iOS, and specifically for iPhone and iPod Touch devices. It is capable of intercepting traffic on a wireless network segment, capturing passwords, and regular expressions entered by the user.

The core system of Pirni, written in C, is open-source software, and licensed under the GNU General Public License.
Pirni Pro is the succeeding version of Pirni, and is commercial software, available in the Cydia Store, for jailbroken Apple devices.

Features
Pirni Pro supports active dissection of all non-ciphered protocols (given that the user has supplied a regular expression for dissection).
The application description contains the following:

 ARP spoof the entire network or any target
 Watch a live feed over interesting packets collected
 Manage regular expressions to filter out data, such as site credentials

In addition, the software also offers the following features:

 Password collectors for: HTTP

External links
 Root at Everything official website
 Cydia Link
 Extensive Tutorial

References

Network analyzers
IOS software